Mandy Nicholson (née Nicholls; born 28 February 1968 in Kingston-upon-Thames) is a field hockey player, who was a member of the British squad that won the bronze medal at the 1992 Summer Olympics in Barcelona. She competed in three consecutive Summer Olympics, starting in 1992. She represented England and won a silver medal, at the 1998 Commonwealth Games in Kuala Lumpur. Four years later she won another silver medal at the 2002 Commonwealth Games.

References

External links
 
 
 

1968 births
Living people
English female field hockey players
Field hockey players at the 1992 Summer Olympics
Field hockey players at the 1996 Summer Olympics
Field hockey players at the 2000 Summer Olympics
Olympic field hockey players of Great Britain
British female field hockey players
Olympic bronze medallists for Great Britain
Commonwealth Games silver medallists for England
Medalists at the 1992 Summer Olympics
Commonwealth Games medallists in field hockey
Field hockey players at the 1998 Commonwealth Games
Medallists at the 1998 Commonwealth Games